Larne Patrick (born 3 November 1988) is a former Wales international rugby league footballer who last played as a  and  for the Leigh Centurions in the Betfred Championship.

Previously playing for the Castleford Tigers (Heritage № 967), Huddersfield Giants and the Wigan Warriors (Heritage № 1061).

Background
Patrick was born in Blackpool, Lancashire, England. He is of Welsh heritage.

Career
Patrick joined Huddersfield from Manly based reserve-grade side Narrabeen Sharks in Australia after being on the academy books at Bradford Bulls. As a youth he won international honours with the England Academy. He made his first team début against Castleford in round 5 of 2009's Super League XIV.

Of Welsh heritage, Patrick committed to Wales at international level and made his international début in the opening match of the 2013 Rugby League World Cup.

In November 2014, Patrick joined Wigan Warriors on a season-long loan in an exchange deal for Jack Hughes.

He played in the 2015 Super League Grand Final defeat by the Leeds Rhinos at Old Trafford.

In April 2016, Patrick joined Castleford Tigers on loan for the remainder of the season. This was later converted into a permanent deal when he signed a 3 year contract in June 2016. However, the contract was ended early when Patrick signed a two-year deal with Leigh in October 2017.

References

External links
Leigh Centurions profile
(archived by web.archive.org) Castleford Tigers profile
(archived by web.archive.org) Statistics at rugby-league.com

1988 births
Living people
Castleford Tigers players
English people of Irish descent
English people of Welsh descent
English rugby league players
Huddersfield Giants players
Leigh Leopards players
Rugby league players from Blackpool
Rugby league props
Wales national rugby league team players
Wigan Warriors players
Workington Town players